Bad Girls from Mars is a 1991 American black comedy science fiction slasher film written by Mark Thomas McGee and directed by Fred Olen Ray. It stars Edy Williams, Oliver Darrow, Brinke Stevens and Jay Richardson.

Plot synopsis
Someone is killing off the female leads of the movie production of Bad Girls from Mars. The producers feel they should try to finish the film, even though they're making a lucrative amount from insurance payoffs, so they fly in European sex bomb Emanuelle as the new lead. Emanuelle (Edy Williams) immediately begins embarrassing the producers by leading a wild party life around town. Meanwhile, the killings continue, and detectives try to stop the fiend responsible.

Cast
 Edy Williams as Emanuelle
 Oliver Darrow as TJ McMasters
 Brinke Stevens as Myra
 Jay Richardson as Richard Trent
 Jeffrey Culver as Mac Regan
 Bob Ruth as Al the Cop
 Dana Bentley as Martine
 Jasae as Terry
 Al Bordighi as Ortelli
 Jerry Miller as Walt

Production
Fred Olen Ray says the film has its genesis with sets left over from Roger Corman's The Masque of the Red Death. The sets were going to be torn down so Ray decided to use them for a film. A script was written, actors hired (including Russ Tamblyn) and Ray shot two days of a sword and sorcery film, Wizards of the Demon Sword. He then planned filming the rest of the film.  They only needed four days, and had five days use left of the camera equipment. Ray had $19,000 left and decided to make a movie. He was inspired by Hollywood Boulevard (1976) and decided to make a movie about making a movie. He says they wanted Adam West and Burt Ward so there are references to Batgirls from Mars and bat symbols in the film, but the actors were not available. Ray says it was one of the first movies to mention Ed Wood. When they started making it was called Emmanuel Goes to Hollywood.

Reception
According to Ray, Demon Sword "tanked financially" in part because the movie wound up at Troma. However Bad Girls from Mars proved quite popular, being released by Lionsgate, tripling its money.

References

External links
 
 

1991 comedy films
1991 science fiction films
1990s American films
1990s English-language films
1990s science fiction comedy films
1990s serial killer films
1990s slasher films
American science fiction comedy films
American serial killer films
American slasher films
Films directed by Fred Olen Ray
Films scored by Louis Febre
Slasher comedy films